Don't Cry Now is the fourth solo studio album by Linda Ronstadt and the first of her studio releases for Asylum Records, following six albums recorded for and released on Capitol Records including three she recorded as a member of the Stone Poneys.

It was reissued on Rhino's Flashback Records in 2009.

Background
The tracks on Don't Cry Now were produced individually, some by John Boylan, who produced Ronstadt's preceding eponymous album; some by singer/songwriter J. D. Souther; and, for the first time in what would ultimately be a long and highly successful professional relationship, by British musician Peter Asher, former member of the '60s rock duo Peter & Gordon. Asher was the head of A&R for Apple Records prior to his move to the United States.

This album contains three songs composed by Souther (Souther and Linda would become romantically involved and he would write several songs for her) one by Randy Newman, a cover of a Neil Young ballad, one originally from the Flying Burrito Brothers, and a version of the Eagles' "Desperado," which the band had released earlier that year.

Although Don't Cry Now marked the start of Ronstadt's long association with Asylum, due to contractual obligations her next recorded album, Heart Like a Wheel, would be released on her previous label, Capitol.

Critical reception

Released in the fall of 1973, Don't Cry Now debuted on the Billboard album chart in late October and peaked at #45, the highest in her career at that point. The album had staying power, spending more than a year on the chart. In addition to "Desperado," Asylum released two other singles. The first, "Love Has No Pride," originally recorded by Bonnie Raitt, peaked at #51 on the Billboard Hot 100 and became a Top 10 Easy Listening hit in Canada. The song has endured over the years becoming one of Ronstadt's signature songs, included in her 7× platinum Greatest Hits. The other, "Silver Threads And Golden Needles," was the second recording of that song by Ronstadt, a previous version having appeared on her 1969 solo debut, Hand Sown ... Home Grown. A re-make of a 1962 hit by the Springfields, "Silver Threads..." peaked at #67 on the Hot 100 and became the first of more than 20 hits to reach the Hot Country Songs chart, peaking at #20 in the spring of 1974.

Don't Cry Now became Ronstadt's second Gold-certified album and was followed by the blockbuster success of Heart Like a Wheel.

Track listing

Personnel 
Adapted from album's liner notes.

 Linda Ronstadt – lead vocals, tambourine (3), backing vocals (5, 8, 9)
 Spooner Oldham – acoustic piano (1, 4, 5)
 John Boylan – electric piano (2)
 Craig Doerge – acoustic piano (6, 10)
 J. D. Souther – acoustic guitar (1, 8), bass (1), electric guitar (4), backing vocals (8)
 Jerry McGee – electric guitar (1)
 Sneaky Pete Kleinow – steel guitar (1, 2, 6, 7)
 Richard Bowden – electric guitar (2, 3, 7, 9, 10)
 Andy Johnson – electric guitar (2)
 Herb Pedersen – acoustic guitar (3), backing vocals (3, 9)
 Ed Black – steel guitar (3, 8, 10), electric guitar (7)
 Larry Carlton – electric guitar (5, 6)
 Buddy Emmons – pedal steel guitar (5)
 Rick Roberts – acoustic guitar (7)
 Glenn Frey – electric guitar (8), steel guitar (9)
 Mike Bowden – bass guitar (2, 3, 7, 9)
 Chris Ethridge – bass guitar (4, 5, 8)
 Leland Sklar – bass guitar (6, 10)
 Dennis St. John – drums (1, 4, 5, 8)
 Mickey McGee – drums (2, 3, 7, 9)
 Russ Kunkel – drums (6, 10)
 Jimmie Fadden – harmonica (1)
 Gib Guilbeau – fiddle (3)
 Jim Gordon – saxophone (4, 9)
 Nino Tempo – saxophone (4, 9)
 Gail Martin – trombone (4, 9)
 McKinley Johnson – trumpet (4, 9)
 Darrell Leonard – trumpet (4, 9)
 Jim Ed Norman – horn arrangements (4, 9), string arrangements (4)
 Jimmie Haskell – string arrangements (2, 7, 10)
 Sid Sharp – concertmaster (2, 4, 7, 10)
 Ginger Holladay – backing vocals (1, 2, 7)
 Mary Holliday – backing vocals (1, 2, 7)
 Clydie King – backing vocals (4, 6, 10)
 Sherlie Matthews – backing vocals (4, 6, 10)
 Marti McCall – backing vocals (4, 6, 10)
 Wendy Waldman – backing vocals (5)

Production 
 J. D. Souther – producer, remixing
 John Boylan – co-producer (2, 3, 7, 9)
 Peter Asher – co-producer (6, 10)
 Peter Granet – engineer
 John Haeny – engineer
 Ric Tarantini – engineer
 Al Schmitt – remixing
 Terry Dunavan – mastering at Elektra Sound Recorders (Los Angeles, California).
 Shawn R. Britton – half-speed mastering 
 Edmund Meitner – technical support
 Tim de Paravicini – technical support
 Glenn Ross – cover design
 Cathy Seeter – cover design
 Ed Caraeff – cover photo
 Terry Wright – sleeve photography

Charts

Certifications

References

1973 albums
Linda Ronstadt albums
Albums arranged by Jimmie Haskell
Albums produced by Peter Asher
Albums produced by John Boylan (record producer)
Asylum Records albums